2021 Egyptian Basketball Super League Finals was a final between the two top Egyptian basketball teams and the winners of the previous two championships, 2018-19, 2019-20  respectively, Zamalek and Al Ittihad. Before this final, Zamalek won 14 league titles and Al Ittihad won 13,Egyptian League. The final is played in a best of five, for the third time in a row. Zamalek won 2020-21 and crowned the 15th title of Egyptian Basketball Super League

Zamalek 

Zamalek finished with the league's in 2nd place, finished the season with a 11–3, in Quarter-finals matchup with Al Ittisalat, Zamalek won 3 Game, And winning the series 3–1. in Semi-finals matchup with Gezira, Zamalek won 3 Game, And winning the series 3–0.

Al Ittihad 

Al Ittihad finished with the league's in 1st place, finished the season with a 12–2, in Quarter-finals matchup with Al Geish Army, Al Ittihad won 3 Game, And winning the series 3–0. in Semi-finals matchup with Al Ahly Al Ittihad won 3 Game, And winning the series 3–0.

Regular season series
The Two Team Tied in the regular season series 1–1.

Road To Final
The playoffs started on 16 April 2021.

Bracket

Series summary

Game summaries

Game 1

Game 2

Game 3

Game 4

Game 5

Player statistics

|-
! scope="row" style="text-align:left;|
| 5 || 5 || 00.0 || .000 || .000 || .000 || 1.6 || 3.4 || 1.4 || 0.0 || 19
|-
! scope="row" style="text-align:left;"|
| 5 || 0 || 00.0 || .000 || .000 || .000 || 3.8 || 0.2 || 0.8 || 0.0 || 2.8
|-
! scope="row" style="text-align:left;"|
| 5 || 5 || 00.0 || .000 || .000 || .000 || 4.6 || 1.2 || 1.8 || 0.2 || 12.2
|-
! scope="row" style="text-align:left;"|
| 5 || 5 || 00.0 || .000 || .000 || .000 || 10 || 5.4 || 1.2 || 1.6 || 6.4
|-
! scope="row" style="text-align:left;"|
| 5 || 5 || 00.0 || .000 || .000 || .000 || 7.6 || 0.8 || 0.6 || 0.0 || 10
|-
! scope="row" style="text-align:left;"|
| 5 || 5 || 00.0 || .000 || .000 || .000 || 2.8 || 2.0 || 1.0 || 0.0 || 11.6
|-
! scope="row" style="text-align:left;"|
| 5 || 0 || 00.0 || .000 || .000 || .000 || 2.8 || 2.0 || 0.2 || 0.0 || 2.6
|-
! scope="row" style="text-align:left;"|
| 2 || 0 || 00.0 || .000 || .000 || .000 || 0.0 || 0.0 || 0.0 || 0.0 || 0.0
|-
! scope="row" style="text-align:left;"|
| 5 || 0 || 00.0 || .000 || .000 || .000 || 1.2 || 0.4 || 0.4 || 0.0 || 4.4
|-
! scope="row" style="text-align:left;"|
| 5 || 0 || 00.0 || .000 || .000 || .000 || 1.6 || 0.0 || 0.6 || 0.2 || 4.4
|-
! scope="row" style="text-align:left;"|
| 2 || 0 || 00.0 || .000 || .000 || .000 || 1.5 || 1.0 || 0.0 || 0.0 || 3.0

References

Basketball competitions in Egypt
Egypt